is a major library in the Nakanoshima section of Osaka, Osaka Prefecture, Japan.

It was established in 1904; and is today one of two libraries which are supported by the Osaka Prefectural government.

History of the building

The Neo-baroque style is enhanced with four massive columns which stand at the building's front entrance.  The building's stone walls harmonize with the other structures build on the island in the same period.  The library's copper roof dome is a distinctive feature.

Initial construction was completed in 1904; and additional construction work in 1922 created an exterior appearance which remains to this day.  The main building and both wings were designated as important cultural assets in 1974. It continues to function as a public library.

The library is located in the vicinity of  Nakanoshima Park.

References

External links
 Osaka Prefectural Nakanoshima Library web site
 Japan Mint: 2002 International Coin Design Competition -- see competitor design, "Centennial of erection of the Nakanoshima Library"... also see "Fine Works" plaster model, Kouji Kitanaka (designer)

Nakanoshima
Library buildings completed in 1904
Libraries in Japan
Tourist attractions in Osaka
1904 establishments in Japan
Buildings and structures in Osaka
Important Cultural Properties of Japan
Libraries established in 1904